Senator Guerrero may refer to:

Lou Leon Guerrero (born 1950), Senator in the Guam Legislature and current Governor of Guam
Manuel Flores Leon Guerrero (1914–1985), Senator in the Guam Legislature
Ramon Deleon Guerrero (1946–2018), Senate of the Northern Mariana Islands